Dowlujerdin-e Bala (also Romanized as Dowlūjerdīn-e Bālā and Dowlowjerdīn-e Bālā; also known as Dowlūjerd, Dowlūjerdanī-ye Bālā, Dowlūjerd-e Bālā, and Dolūjerdīn) is a village in Darjazin-e Sofla Rural District, Qorveh-e Darjazin District, Razan County, Hamadan Province, Iran. At the 2006 census, its population was 79, in 20 families.

References 

Populated places in Razan County